Liotella annulata is a species of minute sea snail, a marine gastropod mollusc in the family Skeneidae.

Description
The diameter of the shell is 1.5 mm. The opaque white shell has a planorbiform shape. It is flattened above, rounded below, with somewhat distant longitudinal lamellae, above and below.  Otherwise it is smooth. The umbilicus is wide. One of the ring-like lamellae forms the peristome.

Distribution
This marine species is endemic to Australia and occurs off South Australia and Tasmania.

References

 Tenison-Woods, J.E. 1879. On some new Tasmanian marine shells. Proceedings of the Royal Society of Tasmania 1877: 121-123
 Tate, R. 1899. A revision of the Australian Cyclostrematidae and Liotiidae. Transactions of the Royal Society of South Australia 23(2): 213-229
 Pritchard, G.B. & Gatliff, J.H. 1902. Catalogue of the marine shells of Victoria. Part V. Proceedings of the Royal Society of Victoria 14(2): 85-138
 Cotton, B.C. 1959. South Australian Mollusca. Archaeogastropoda. Handbook of the Flora and Fauna of South Australia. Adelaide : South Australian Government Printer 449 pp.
 Trew, A. 1984. The Melvill-Tomlin Collection. Part 30. Trochacea. Handlists of the Molluscan Collections in the Department of Zoology, National Museum of Wales. National Museum of Wales, Cardiff.

External links
 

annulata
Gastropods of Australia
Gastropods described in 1874